The Pergamon World Atlas (in English, 1968) was originally prepared by the Polish Army Topographical Service. It was published as the Atlas Świata (World Atlas) in 1962.

The atlas contains 380 pages of maps, figures and tables along with an index of 150,000 entries. Each geographic map is accompanied by a selection of thematic maps and city maps. The Pergamon added extra maps of the United Kingdom and Canada.

Notes

Atlases
1968 non-fiction books